The 2007 Chivas USA season was the club's third season of existence, and their third in Major League Soccer, the top flight of American soccer. The club competed in the MLS's Western Conference, where they finished in first place, in their Conference, qualifying for the Playoffs for the second time.

Season review

On November 23, 2005, Chivas appointed Bob Bradley as their new manager. Bradley left the club on January 17, 2007, to become manager of the United States men's national team and was replaced by assistant coach Preki.

Transfers

In

Out

Roster

Competitions

MLS

League table

Results summary

Results

MLS Cup Playoffs

U.S. Open Cup

Friendlies

Statistics

Appearances and goals

|-
|colspan="14"|Players away from Chivas USA on loan:

|-
|colspan="14"|Players who left Chivas USA during the season:

|}

Goal scorers

Disciplinary Record

References

Chivas USA seasons
Chivas USA
Chivas USA
Chivas USA